William Mills (1701-1750) was a British stage actor.

The son of veteran stage actor John Mills and his wife Margaret Mills, he was born in London and baptised at St Martin-in-the-Fields on 29 June 1701. Under his father's guidance he made his debut as a child actor in 1712.

Like his father, he was a long-standing member of the Drury Lane theatre company. He took part in the Actor Rebellion of 1733, and left to work at the Haymarket Theatre for a season before returning to Drury Lane. His last appearance was in The Merchant of Venice in February 1750 and he died two months later on 18 April, shortly before a benefit was to be staged for him, and was buried at St Martin-in-the-Fields.

He was married to the actress Theodosia Mills until her death in 1733, after which he married another actress Elizabeth Holliday. With his first wife he had a daughter also called Theodosia who likewise became an actress.

Selected roles
 Diego in Love in a Veil by Richard Savage (1718)
 Mandrocles in The Spartan Dame by Thomas Southerne (1719)
 Auletes in Busiris, King of Egypt by Edward Young (1719)
 Artamas in The Siege of Damascus by John Hughes (1720)
 Idwall in The Briton by Ambrose Philips (1722)
 Duke of Buckingham in Humphrey, Duke of Gloucester by Ambrose Philips (1723)
 Charles in Love in a Forest by Charles Johnson (1723)
 Aegon in Hecuba by Richard West (1726)
 Aegeus in Medea by Charles Johnson (1730)
 Vice Chancellor in The Humours of Oxford by James Miller (1730)
 Olinphus in Timoleon by Benjamin Martyn (1730)
 Trueman in The London Merchant by George Lillo (1731)
 Aristarchus in The Triumphs of Love and Honour by Thomas Cooke (1731)
 Medon in Eurydice by David Mallet (1731)
 Wronglove in Caelia by Charles Johnson (1732)
 Clerimont in The Miser by Henry Fielding (1733)
 Beaumont in The Mother-in-Law by James Miller (1734)
 Caelius in Junius Brutus by William Duncombe (1734)
 Gaylove in The Universal Gallant by Henry Fielding (1735)
 Harcourt in The Man of Taste by James Miller (1735)
 Mahomet in The Christian Hero by George Lillo (1735)
 Bellario in The Universal Passion by James Miller (1737)
 Truemore in Art and Nature  by James Miller (1738)
 Artamon in The Fatal Retirement by Anthony Brown (1739)
 Rustan in Mustapha by David Mallet (1739)
 Andrew II in Elmerick by George Lillo (1740)
 Stargaze in The Astrologer by James Ralph (1744)
 Metullus in Regulus by William Havard (1744)
 Gratiano in The Merchant of Venice by William Shakespeare (1750)

References

Bibliography
 Highfill, Philip H, Burnim, Kalman A. & Langhans, Edward A. A Biographical Dictionary of Actors, Actresses, Musicians, Dancers, Managers, and Other Stage Personnel in London, 1660-1800: Garrick to Gyngell. SIU Press, 1978.
 Straub, Kristina, G. Anderson, Misty and O'Quinn, Daniel . The Routledge Anthology of Restoration and Eighteenth-Century Drama. Taylor & Francis,  2017.

18th-century English people
English male stage actors
British male stage actors
18th-century English male actors
18th-century British male actors
1701 births
1750 deaths
Male actors from London